Florissantia can refer to:

Florissantia (plant), an extinct plant genus in the family Malvaceae
Florissantia (planthopper), an extinct dictyopharid planthopper insect genus